A dumbwaiter (lit. "silent waiter") is a small freight elevator.

Dumbwaiter may also refer to:
 Lazy Susan, a small rotating table to serve food on a table
 The Dumb Waiter, a 1957 one-act play by Harold Pinter
 Dumb Waiters, a 1980 album by The Korgis
 "Dumb Waiters" (song), a 1981 song by the Psychedelic Furs